Myanmar Institute of Information Technology (abbreviated MIIT) is a technological university located in Chanmyathazi Township, Mandalay, Myanmar. It was set up as a National Centre of Excellence in 2015 as a result of a Memorandum of Understanding between the Government of the Republic of the Union of Myanmar and the Government of the Republic of India. It currently offers Bachelor of Engineering degrees in computer science and engineering and electronics and communications engineering.

Campus 
MIIT is located on a 7-acre campus in the south-western part of Mandalay. The classrooms and laboratories operate from a six-story structure. The main academic building is equipped with multiple teaching and learning spaces that include classrooms, laboratories, an auditorium, and recreational areas.

MIIT provides residential facilities for its entire teaching staff. Separate hostel facilities for both boys and girls are also provided.

Academics 
MIIT currently offers two undergraduate degree programmes in computer science and engineering and electronics and communications (engineering).

Admissions 
Students are admitted to the Bachelor of Engineering (Honours) programmes in computer science and engineering and electronics and communications Engineering once each year, for the academic year starting in December.

Input Qualifications 
Applicants must have passed the Matriculation Exam of Myanmar in the year of admission, with mathematics, physics, chemistry, and English as the subjects.

References

External links

 Myanmar Institute of Information Technology, Mandalay

Universities and colleges in Myanmar
Technological universities in Myanmar
Universities and colleges in Mandalay Region